Peter Wieland (stage name of Ralf Sauer; 6 July 1930 – 2 March 2020) was a German singer.

Biography

The Sauer family left Stralsund following World War II, moving to Köthen. Here, Ralf trained as a carpenter. His musical talent was discovered at his local church, and he subsequently won a choir competition in the mid-1950s. He studied at the Hochschule für Musik "Hanns Eisler", where he trained as an opera baritone. He became an opera singer at the theatre in Neustrelitz for three years, and then branched out into other genres of music. In 1957, he took the stage name Peter Wieland.

Wieland began working at the music review Das goldene Prag and began a long acting career at the Friedrichstadt-Palast. After the fall of East Germany, Wieland appeared on television programs, such as Sommermelodien, Weihnachten bei uns, and Gute Zeiten, schlechte Zeiten. In 1999 and 2000, he played the role of Emperor François-Joseph in the operetta L'Auberge du Cheval-Blanc.

Peter Wieland died on 2 March 2020 at the age of 89.

Discography

Weißer Winterwald among others.

References

External links
 

1930 births
2020 deaths
German male musicians
German television personalities
People from Stralsund